Thomas Laszlo Winkler (born 20 November 1985) is a Swiss heavy metal singer, lawyer, and notary. He is known for being the vocalist of power metal band Angus McSix and former vocalist of symphonic power metal band Gloryhammer from 2011 to 2021, playing the roles of "Angus McFife, Prince of the Land of Fife" and his descendant "Angus McFife XIII" in the band's internal story.

Biography 

Born in Zollikofen, Bern, Switzerland, Winkler started his music career in 2009 after finishing his studies at the University of Bern as Master of Law by joining Swiss heavy metal bands Emerald and T-Rage.

Winkler has also lent his voice to Chinese power metal band Barque of Dante for their single "Way of Your Life" in 2011 and stated he would contribute vocals for their second studio album "Lasting Forever".

In 2010, he uploaded a video to YouTube of himself auditioning for the British power metal band DragonForce. He was later discovered by Christopher Bowes, vocalist of the Scottish-based pirate metal band Alestorm, and was offered to join Gloryhammer. He initially declined but joined sometime later after several more offers. He was a member of the band since 2012, and had recorded three full-length albums with them.

On 22 August 2021, Gloryhammer announced that Thomas Winkler was no longer a member of the band. Thomas later addressed the situation, citing the band's reasons for his departure as disagreements on business and organizational matters.

Angus McSix

On 4 July 2022, Thomas announced that he would be returning to music-making, and he had signed with Napalm Records under his new act Angus McSix. On 10 October 2022, the full lineup for Angus McSix was announced, with Winkler being joined by Thalìa Bellazecca, Manu Lotter and Sebastian Levermann who will represent characters in the story concept and appear in costumes. The band's first single, "Master of the Universe", was released on 19 January 2023, simultaneously with the announcement of the debut studio album, Angus McSix and the Sword of Power, which is set to be released on 21 April 2023.

Discography

Angus McSix 
Studio albums
 Angus McSix and the Sword of Power (2023)

Emerald 
Studio albums
 Re-Forged (2010)
 Unleashed (2012)

Gloryhammer
Studio albums
 Tales from the Kingdom of Fife (2013)
 Space 1992: Rise of the Chaos Wizards (2015)
 Legends from Beyond the Galactic Terrorvortex (2019)

Barque of Dante
Studio albums
 Lasting Forever (2013)

References

External links 
 

Singers with a five-octave vocal range
Living people
1985 births
21st-century Swiss  male singers
Swiss heavy metal singers